State Route 279 (SR 279) is a south-north state highway in the southwestern part of the Atlanta metropolitan area. Its routing is within northern Fayette and southern Fulton County.

Route description
SR 279 begins at an intersection with SR 85 northeast of Fayetteville. Here, the roadway continues to the east as Carnegie Place. It heads west, and then northwest, along Old National Highway to an intersection with SR 314 (W. Fayetteville Road). The route heads north west until it intersects SR 138 (Jonesboro Road). SR 279 heads north into College Park to an interchange with Interstate 285 (I-285, aka Atlanta Bypass). Just north of this, it crosses a bridge over US 29/SR 14 (Roosevelt Highway). The road curves to the east to Herschel Road, where it turns right to meet its northern terminus, an intersection with US 29/SR 14.

History

Major intersections

See also

References

External links

 

279
Transportation in Fulton County, Georgia
Transportation in Fayette County, Georgia
College Park, Georgia